China National Highway 310 (G310) runs northwest from Lianyungang, Jiangsu towards Anhui, Henan, Shaanxi provinces, and ends in Tianshui, Gansu. It was originally 1613 kilometres in length, but was later extended westward to Gonghe County in Qinghai.

It runs parallel to the important G30 Lianyungang–Khorgas Expressway and Longhai railway east-west transport corridors.

Route and distance

See also 

 China National Highways

References

Transport in Gansu
Transport in Anhui
Transport in Jiangsu
Transport in Henan
Transport in Shaanxi
310